The Beaded Moccasins: The Story of Mary Campbell is an  historical novel, written by award-winning author Lynda Durrant in 2000.  The book is also referred to as simply The Beaded Moccasins. It is about a settler girl who turns twelve only to find herself kidnapped by Native Americans. Follow her on her epic journey to see if she becomes The-Woman-Who-Saved-The-Corn.

The novel is based on the story of Mary Campbell, who was abducted by Lenape in 1758 and remained with them until 1764.

Awards
The Beaded Moccasins has received the following awards:
Notable Children's Trade Book in the Field of Social Studies selection by the National Council for the Social Studies/Children's Book Council 1998
1999 Ohioana Book Award (juvenile category)
Books for the Teenage selection, New York Public Library

References

1998 American novels
1998 children's books
American children's novels
American historical novels
Children's historical novels
Novels about child abduction
Novels set in the American colonial era